The Devonshire Street Cemetery (also known as the Brickfield Cemetery or Sandhills Cemetery) was located between Eddy Avenue and Elizabeth Street, and between Chalmers and Devonshire Streets, at Brickfield Hill, in Sydney, Australia. It was consecrated in 1820. The Jewish section was used from 1832. By 1860, the cemetery was full, and it was closed in 1867.

History
In 1820, Governor Macquarie ordered the consecration of the Devonshire Street Cemetery. The burial ground was set aside on Brickfield Hill. These cemeteries were the principal burial grounds from 1820 to 1866 in Sydney and they were often called the Sandhills Cemetery, a colloquial name found on some death certificates which reflects the land at the edge of Surry Hills.

A brick wall was erected before any interments took place to enclose its . A road was formed along the southern boundary of the cemetery in the first half of the 1830s and was called Devonshire Street. The Devonshire Street Cemetery, where many of the early settlers were buried, was later moved to build the Sydney railway terminus.

In 1901, the cemetery was resumed to allow for the development of Central railway station, Sydney and representatives of deceased persons buried in the Devonshire Street cemetery were given two months to arrange for exhumation and removal of remains from the cemetery. All reasonable costs were borne by the Government of New South Wales. The remains that were unclaimed were relocated to a purpose-built cemetery named Bunnerong Cemetery.  Remains that were claimed were transferred to a number of cemeteries as listed below. Bunnerong Cemetery, south of the city, had a tram line constructed to make the removal of recasketed remains as simple as possible. Bunnerong Cemetery was next to the Botany Cemetery and, in the early 1970s, was absorbed by that cemetery to create the Eastern Suburbs Memorial Park. Central railway station was opened on 4 August 1906.

Re-interment cemeteries
Cemetery locations in the metropolitan region that took re-interments from Devonshire Street Cemetery include Gore Hill cemetery, St Thomas Cemetery in Crows Nest, Rookwood Cemetery, Waverley Cemetery, Balmain Cemetery, Camperdown General Cemetery, Randwick General Cemetery, Bunnerong Cemetery, Field of Mars Cemetery, South Head General Cemetery and Woronora Memorial Park. Remains were also relocated outside the metropolitan area, including Sandgate Cemetery in Newcastle, New South Wales and Berkeley Pioneer Cemetery in Unanderra, New South Wales.

An index created from a number of previous collections of information, including some remaining original cemetery registers, called the Devonshire Street Cemetery re-interment register and index ("microform" format) was produced by the Library of Australian History, North Sydney, 1999. A copy is held by the State Library of New South Wales. A hardback book version was also produced.

Notable people buried in Devonshire Street Cemeteries

 Aaron Buzacott (1800–1864), Congregational minister, missionary at Rarotonga and founder of Takamoa Theological College; reinterred at Rookwood Cemetery
 Robert Cooper, business man
 William Cowper, Anglican archdeacon
 Allan Cunningham, English botanist and explorer
 John Dunn, bushranger
 Michael Dwyer, Irish convict and leader of the Irish Rebellion of 1798
 Cora Gooseberry, Murro-ore-dial woman and cultural knowledge keeper
 John Gurner, chief clerk of the NSW Supreme Court for many years, solicitor, landowner
 George Howe, printer of The Sydney Gazette and the New South Wales Advertiser
 James Hume, architect
 Barnett Levey, merchant and theatre director
 Isaac Nichols, convict, farmer, ship owner, public servant and Australia's first postmaster
 Mary Reibey, merchant, ship owner and trader
 Lancelot Threlkeld, missionary
 Robert Wardell, barrister and co-founder of The Australian newspaper
 Celia Wills, daughter of Mary Reibey 
 David Stuurman, South African Khoi Chief and political activist (c. 1773–1830)
 John Joseph William Molesworth Oxley, Surveyor-General and Explorer (c. 1784–1828)

References

External links
 Dead Central – 2019 exhibition at the State Library of New South Wales about the Cemetery
 List of Devonshire Street Burials at Project Gutenberg Australia

Buildings and structures in Sydney
Cemeteries in Sydney
1820 establishments in Australia
1867 disestablishments
19th-century disestablishments in Australia